Kummanayakanakoppa is a village in Dharwad district of Karnataka, India.

Demographics 
As of the 2011 Census of India there were 23 households in Kummanayakanakoppa and a total population of 89 consisting of 47 males and 42 females. There were 14 children ages 0-6.

References

Villages in Dharwad district